Nethercott is a surname. Notable people with the surname include:

Acer Nethercott (1977–2013), English rower
 Casey Nethercott, co-founder of Ranch Rescue, in the United States
Ken Nethercott (1925–2007), English footballer
Stuart Nethercott (born 1973), English footballer

See also
Nethercott, neighbourhood of Tackley, Oxfordshire, England